Mnich (English: Monk)  is a mountain in the Tatra Mountains on the Morskie Oko of Poland. It has an elevation of 2,068 meters above sea level.

High Tatras
Mountains of the Western Carpathians
Two-thousanders of Poland